Het Jonge Schaap (The young sheep) is the name of a wooden wind powered sawmill, located in the Zaanse Schans, in the municipality of Zaanstad.

The original mill was built in 1680 and demolished in 1942. Between 2005 and 2007, a replica of the mill at the Zaanse Schans was built, between the mills "De Zoeker" and "De Bonte Hen". The construction of the replica was based on detailed drawings Anton Sipman had made before the original mill was demolished.

See also 

 De Kat, Zaandam
 De Huisman, Zaandam
 De Os, Zaandam
 De Zoeker, Zaandam
 De Gekroonde Poelenburg, Zaandam

External links 

 De website van de molen
 Een uitgebreid fotoverslag van de herbouw
 Vereniging de Zaansche Molen

Windmills in North Holland
Populated places in North Holland
Smock mills in the Netherlands
Windmills completed in 2007
Zaandam